In enzymology, a testosterone 17beta-dehydrogenase is an enzyme that catalyzes the chemical reaction between testosterone and androst-4-ene-3,17-dione. This enzyme belongs to the family of oxidoreductases, specifically those acting on the CH-OH group of donor with NAD+ or NADP+ as acceptor. 

The systematic name of this enzyme class is 17beta-hydroxysteroid:NAD+ 17-oxidoreductase. Other names in common use include 17-ketoreductase and 17beta-HSD. This enzyme participates in androgen and estrogen metabolism.

Variants
There are two variants of the enzyme, one that uses NAD+ as a substrate, and one that uses NADP+ as acceptor.

NAD+

This variant of testosterone 17beta-dehydrogenase catalyzes the reaction

testosterone + NAD+  androst-4-ene-3,17-dione + NADH + H+

Thus, the two substrates of this enzyme are testosterone and NAD+, whereas its 3 products are androst-4-ene-3,17-dione, NADH, and H+.

NADP+

This variant of testosterone 17beta-dehydrogenase catalyzes the reaction

testosterone + NADP+  androst-4-ene-3,17-dione + NADPH + H+

Thus, the two substrates of this enzyme are testosterone and NADP+, whereas its 3 products are androst-4-ene-3,17-dione, NADPH, and H+.

References

External links
Testodren - Testosterone Booster

EC 1.1.1
Testosterone
NADH-dependent enzymes
NADPH-dependent enzymes
Enzymes of known structure
Enzymes of unknown structure